The 12th Pan American Games were held in Mar del Plata, Argentina from March 11 to March 26, 1995.

Medalists

Results by event

See also
Chile at the Pan American Games
Chile at the 1996 Summer Olympics

External links
COCH - Comité Olimpico de Chile Official site.

Nations at the 1995 Pan American Games
Pan American Games
1995